Islamabad Medical and Dental College is a medical and dental college located in Islamabad, Pakistan. The college gives admission to 100 MBBS, 50 BDS, and 4 MDS students each year.

Affiliations
Islamabad Medical and Dental College is affiliated with Shaheed Zulfiqar Ali Bhutto Medical University and is recognized by the Pakistan Medical Commission and the Ministry of Health. The college is listed in the International Medical Education Directory and WHO Directory of Medical Schools.

The college had three attached teaching hospitals: Social Security Hospital, Ahmed Medical Complex, and St Joseph's Hospice, Rawalpindi. The college has also been working with its own new multi-disciplinary 500-650 bed hospital, Dr. Akbar Niazi Teaching Hospital, located beside the college building. The hospital offers services in various medical and surgical specialties including cardiology, dermatology, nephrology, psychiatry, ophthalmology, obstetrics and gynaecology, urology, general surgery, otorhinolaryngology, neurosurgery, bone marrow transplant (BMT) as well as outpatient department (OPD), inpatient department (IPD), and executive clinics. The hospital also offers training programs in medicine.

The College is affiliated with its own state of the art dentistry hospital, Islamabad Dental Hospital located in Bhara Kahu, main Murree road, Islamabad. The hospital specializes in treating patients of various sub-branches of dentistry including maxillofacial surgery, oral medicine, periodontology and many others.

See also
Dr. Akbar Niazi Teaching Hospital
List of schools of medicine in Pakistan

References

External links

Medical colleges in Islamabad
Dental schools in Pakistan
Universities and colleges in Islamabad